Concierto de Aranjuez is a 1991 album by Paco de Lucía. The first 3 tracks are his interpretation of Joaquín Rodrigo's Concierto de Aranjuez while tracks 4-6 are his interpretation of Isaac Albéniz's Iberia.

Track listing

"Allegro con spirito" – 5:49
"Adagio" – 11:35
"Allegro gentile" – 5:29
"Triana" – 5:02
"El Albaicín" – 7:30
"El Puerto" – 3:44

Musicians
Paco de Lucía - Flamenco guitar
José María Bandera - Flamenco guitar (Albéniz only)
Juan Manuel Cañizares - Flamenco guitar (Albéniz only)
Orquesta de Cadaqués (Rodrigo only)
Edmon Colomer - Conductor (Rodrigo only)

1991 classical albums
Paco de Lucía albums